Boyertown station was a Reading Company station in Boyertown, Pennsylvania on the Colebrookdale branch that is currently a heritage railroad station served by the Colebrookdale Railroad. Reading passenger service ended in 1950. There is currently a small building serving as the ticket house, but there are plans in the works to build a grand 8000 square foot station that would serve as the main station with a restaurant. Once that is complete the current station will turn into a bike rental.

References

Railway stations in Pennsylvania
Former Reading Company stations
Railway stations in the United States opened in 1869
1869 establishments in Pennsylvania